Events in the year 1851 in Norway.

Incumbents
Monarch: Oscar I

Events

Arts and literature
10 January – The Norwegian Booksellers Association (Den Norske Bokhandlerforening) is founded.

Births

January to June
2 January – Haldor Boen, teacher and politician in America (died 1912)
25 January – Arne Garborg, writer (died 1924)
28 January – Andreas Aubert, art historian (died 1913)
11 June – Oscar Borg, composer (died 1930)

July to December
23 July – Peder Severin Krøyer, painter (died 1909)
20 August – Abraham Berge, politician and Minister (died 1936)
23 September – Ola Thommessen, newspaper editor (died 1942)
2 October – Elias Sunde, politician and Minister (died 1910).
30 October – Leonhard Hess Stejneger, zoologist (died 1943)
10 November – Waldemar Christofer Brøgger, geologist and mineralogist (died 1940)
25 November – Hans Andersen Foss, author, newspaper editor and temperance leader in America (died 1929)

Full date unknown
Gunvald Aus, engineer (died 1950)
Peter W. K. Bøckman, Sr., bishop and theologian (died 1926)
Nicolai A. Grevstad, diplomat, politician and newspaper editor in America (died 1940)
Knut Eriksson Helland, Hardanger fiddle maker (died 1880)
Herman Jeremiassen, ship-owner and politician (died 1943)
Carl Sofus Lumholtz, discoverer and ethnographer (died 1922)
Olaj Olsen, jurist and politician (died 1920)
August Geelmuyden Spørck, politician and Minister (died 1928)
Oscar Sigvald Julius Strugstad, politician and Minister (died 1919)
Aasmund Halvorsen Vinje, politician and Minister (died 1917)

Deaths
5 July – Olaus Michael Schmidt, judge and politician (born 1784)

Full date unknown
Palle Rømer Fleischer, politician and Minister (born 1781)
Hilmar Meincke Krohg, politician (born 1776)

See also

References